The women's 400 metres at the 2018 IAAF World Indoor Championships took place on 2 and 3 March 2018.

Summary
The two Americans with the fastest times in the semi-final round, Shakima Wimbley and Courtney Okolo were given the outer two lanes in the final, 5 and 6 respectively.  Wimbley started quickly, making up a little ground on Okolo's stagger, while Okolo took a more measured approach to her speed, putting on a burst just before the cones, then taking the tangent to lane 1 to take the lead unobstructed.  Wimbley closed in much sooner, forcing Eilidh Doyle to squeeze inside to take second position with a lap to go.  Okolo just continued to extend her lead, seven metres by the finish for a clear win.  Wimbley ran on Doyle's outside through most of the last lap, finally conceding to run the last part of the last turn behind Doyle.  On the final straightaway, Wimbley took one more run at Doyle, passing her for the silver.  Justyna Święty-Ersetic also closed quickly but could not catch Doyle for bronze.

Results

Heats
The heats were started on 2 March at 12:10.

Semifinal
The semifinals were started on 2 March at 20:32.

Final
The final was started on 3 March at 20:05.

References

400 metres
400 metres at the World Athletics Indoor Championships
2018 in women's athletics